Bethanie Mattek and Sania Mirza were the defending champions, but Mattek chose not to participate, while Mirza chose to compete the Beijing Summer Olympics instead.

Maria Kirilenko and Nadia Petrova won in the final 6–3, 4–6, [10–8], against Su-wei Hsieh and Yaroslava Shvedova.

Seeds

  Su-wei Hsieh /  Yaroslava Shvedova (final)
  Maria Kirilenko /  Nadia Petrova (champions)
  Jasmin Wöhr /  Barbora Záhlavová-Strýcová (semifinals)
  Stéphanie Dubois /  Ekaterina Makarova (first round)

Draw

Draw

External links
Draw

Doubles